Crime and Punishment is a 1969 Soviet drama film in two parts directed by Lev Kulidzhanov, based on the eponymous 1866 novel by Fyodor Dostoevsky.

Plot
Raskolnikov, an impoverished ex-law student, kills an old pawnbroker and her sister, perhaps for money, perhaps to prove a theory about being above the law. He comes to police attention through normal procedures (he was the victim's client), but his outbursts make him the prime suspect of the clever Porfiry. Meanwhile, life swirls around Raskolnikov: his mother and sister come to the city followed by two older men seeking his sister's hand; he meets a drunken clerk who is then killed in a traffic accident, and he falls in love with the man's daughter, Sonia, a young prostitute. She urges him to confess, promising to follow him to Siberia.

Cast
 Georgy Taratorkin as Rodion Romanovich Raskolnikov
 Innokenty Smoktunovsky as Porfiry Petrovitch
 Tatyana Bedova as Sonya Marmeladova
 Victoria Fyodorova as Avdotya Romanovna
 Yefim Kopelyan as Svidrigailov
 Yevgeni Lebedev as Marmeladov
 Maya Bulgakova as Yekaterina Ivanovna
 Irina Gosheva as Pulkheriya Aleksandrovna
 Vladimir Basov as Luzhin
 Aleksandr Pavlov as Razumikhin
 Vladimir Belokurov as Innkeeper
 Inna Makarova as Nastasya
 Sergei Nikonenko as Nikolai		
 Valery Nosik as Zametov
 Dzidra Ritenberga as Luiza Ivanovna
 Ivan Ryzhov as Tit Vasilievich
 Yuri Sarantsev as Lieutenant 'Powder'
 Lyubov Sokolova as Yelizaveta
 Vladimir Nosik as tavern servant

External links

1969 films
1969 crime drama films
Soviet crime drama films
Russian crime drama films
Gorky Film Studio films
Soviet black-and-white films
Films directed by Lev Kulidzhanov
Soviet television films
Films based on Crime and Punishment
1969 television films
Russian black-and-white films